Alsask Lake is a lake in Saskatchewan, Canada, located about  southeast of Alsask. The lake is a natural source for sodium sulfate and until 1991 an extraction plant was operated by Francanna Minerals (Sodium Sulfate Company).

Climate
Alsask experiences a semi-arid climate (Köppen climate classification: BSk). Winters are long, cold and dry, while summers are short and warm.

The weather station is located adjacent to the lake.

See also
List of lakes of Saskatchewan

References

Lakes of Saskatchewan